This article details the 2009–10 UEFA Champions League qualifying phase and play-off round.

There are two paths:
Champions Path, which include all domestic champions which do not automatically qualify for the group stage.
Non-Champions Path (also called the Best-placed Path), which include all non-domestic champions which do not automatically qualify for the group stage.

All times CEST (UTC+2)

Teams
This table shows the path of all 54 teams (39 in Champions Path, 15 in Non-Champions path) involved in the qualifying phase and play-off round. 10 teams (5 in Champions Path, 5 in Non-Champions Path) qualified for the group stage to join the 22 automatic qualifiers.

Champions Path

Non-Champions Path

First qualifying round

Seeding
Teams with a coefficient of at least 0.100 were seeded.

Summary

|}
Notes

Matches

2–2 on aggregate; Sant Julia won on penalties.

Mogren won 6–0 on aggregate.

Second qualifying round

Seeding
Teams with a coefficient of at least 1.933 were seeded.

Notes

Summary

|}

Matches

Stabæk won 5–1 on aggregate.

Maribor won 3–1 on aggregate.

APOEL won 5–0 on aggregate.

Copenhagen won 12–0 on aggregate.

3–3 on aggregate; Debrecen won on away goals.

BATE won 4–0 on aggregate.

Aktobe won 6–0 on aggregate.

Dinamo Zagreb won 3–0 on aggregate.

Ventspils won 6–1 on aggregate.

Baku won 6–4 on aggregate.

Red Bull Salzburg won 2–1 on aggregate.

Slovan Bratislava won 4–1 on aggregate.

Sheriff Tiraspol won 2–0 on aggregate.

Partizan won 12–0 on aggregate.

Levadia won 2–1 on aggregate.

Levski Sofia won 9–0 on aggregate.

Maccabi Haifa won 10–0 on aggregate.

Third qualifying round

Seeding
In the Champions Path, teams with a coefficient of at least 7.733 were seeded. Levadia Tallinn were also seeded because the draw was held before the second qualifying round, in which they beat a team who would have been seeded. In the Non-Champions Path, teams with a coefficient of at least 32.065 were seeded.

Notes

Summary

|-
|+Champions Path

|}

|+Non-Champions Path

|}

First leg

Red Bull Salzburg won 3–2 on aggregate.

Olympiacos won 4–0 on aggregate.

Zürich won 5–3 on aggregate.

APOEL won 2–1 on aggregate.

1–1 on aggregate; Sheriff Tiraspol won on away goals.

Maccabi Haifa won 4–3 on aggregate.

Levski Sofia won 2–0 on aggregate.

2–2 on aggregate; Ventspils won on away goals.

Debrecen won 2–0 on aggregate.

Copenhagen won 3–1 on aggregate.

Panathinaikos won 4–3 on aggregate.

2–2 on aggregate; Timișoara won on away goals.

1–1 on aggregate; Sporting CP won on away goals.

Celtic won 2–1 on aggregate.

Anderlecht won 6–3 on aggregate.

Play-off round

Seeding
In the Champions Path, teams with a coefficient of at least 14.050 were seeded. In the Non-Champions Path, teams with a coefficient of at least 45.339 were seeded.

Summary

|-
|+Champions Path

|}

|+Non-Champions Path

|}

Matches

Olympiacos won 3–0 on aggregate.

Maccabi Haifa won 5–1 on aggregate.

Zürich won 5–1 on aggregate.

APOEL won 3–2 on aggregate.

Debrecen won 4–1 on aggregate.

Lyon won 8–2 on aggregate.

Arsenal won 5–1 on aggregate.

Stuttgart won 2–0 on aggregate.

3–3 on aggregate; Fiorentina won on away goals.

Atlético Madrid won 5–2 on aggregate.

Notes

References

External links

2009–10 UEFA Champions League, UEFA.com

Qualifying rounds
2009-10